Yegor Khvalko (born 18 February 1997) is a Belarusian professional footballer who plays for Kapaz.

References

External links 
 
 
 Profile at Neman Grodno website

1997 births
Living people
People from Baranavichy
Sportspeople from Brest Region
Belarusian footballers
Association football defenders
Belarusian expatriate footballers
Expatriate footballers in Azerbaijan
FC Neman Grodno players
FC Lida players
FC Dnyapro Mogilev players
FC Arsenal Dzerzhinsk players
Kapaz PFK players